Greater Bangkok commuter rail is a commuter rail system in Bangkok Metropolitan Region, Phra Nakhon Si Ayutthaya Province, Saraburi Province, Lopburi Province, Suphan Buri Province, Ratchaburi Province, Chacheongsao Province, Nakhon Nayok Province, Prachinburi Province, and Samut Songkhram Province. It runs from and to the outskirts of the city during the rush hour, and the passenger number is high. It is operated by State Railway of Thailand (SRT) that also operates inter-city rail. Commuter rail services always have number 3xx. Most of the system are double track.

Current lines

Rolling stock

Current

Former

Maeklong Railway

The line consist of two sections: the eastern Mahachai Line, which runs between Samut Sakhon and Wongwian Yai with 18 stations; and the Ban Laem Line, which runs between Samut Sakhon and Samut Songkhram with 15 stations. The two stretches are separated by the Tha Chin River at Samut Sakhon. The only way to connect between the stations on the opposite sides of the river is by boat.

Red Lines Commuter rail

The Red Line Mass Transit System Project is a planned commuter rail system to serve the Bangkok Metropolitan Region. Part of the Mass Rapid Transit Master Plan in Bangkok Metropolitan Region, it will consist of two lines, one (also referred to as the Dark Red Line) running from Thammasat University's Rangsit campus to Maha Chai in Samut Sakhon Province, and the other (Light Red Line) running from Sala Ya in Nakhon Pathom Province to Hua Mak in Bangkok, with both passing through Bang Sue which will act as a connecting hub to the MRT system. As of 2012, the Bang Sue – Taling Chan segment of the Light Red Line is under construction, and the Bang Sue – Rangsit segment of the Dark Red Line is being prepared for construction bidding. Most of the railway will run alongside existing national railway tracks, eventually replacing them. Segments running through inner-city areas will be elevated, and the system will be electrified by overhead lines. The system is to be owned and is being developed by the State Railway of Thailand. Since the Red Lines run roughly along the alignment of the failed Hopewell Project, they have been described as a "Hopewell revival".

See also
 Mass Rapid Transit Master Plan in Bangkok Metropolitan Region
 List of urban rail systems in Thailand
 MRT (Bangkok)
 BTS Skytrain
 Airport Rail Link (Bangkok)
 SRT Red Lines

References

Rail transport in Bangkok
Railway lines in Thailand
Public transport in Thailand
Passenger rail transport in Thailand
Metre gauge railways in Thailand